Larisa Igorevna Brychyova (born 26 May 1957 in Moscow) is a Russian jurist and politician. She is Aide to the President of Russia and head of the Presidential State-Legal Directorate.

Biography 
Born on  May 26, 1957 in Moscow.

Graduated from the law faculty of Moscow State University in 1981, and completed post-graduate studies at the Institute of State and Law of the USSR Academy of Sciences in 1985. Holds a PhD in law. Honoured lawyer of the Russian Federation.

She began working in 1974 as a consultant at the State Arbitration court at the Moscow Oblast Executive Committee, and later as a legal consultant and senior legal consultant at a number of Moscow enterprises and organizations.

1985–1987: Research assistant at the Institute of State and Law of the USSR Academy of Sciences.

1987–1992: Department Editor; Deputy Editor of the magazine "Soviet State and Law".

1992–1993: Head specialist of the Legislation Committee of the Supreme Soviet of Russia; sector head of the Commission of the Republic Council on economic reform of the Supreme Council of the Russian Federation.

1993-1999: Occupied important state positions of state service of the Russian Federation: Head of Department in the Russian Federation Presidential Executive Office; Head of Staff of the Presidential Plenipotentiary in the Federal Assembly; Deputy Head of the Main State Legal Department of the President of the Russian Federation.

In 1999, she was appointed Head of the Main State Legal Department of the President of the Russian Federation.

In March 2004, she was appointed Aide to the President, and Head of the State Legal Directorate in the Presidential Executive Office.

Sources 
 Official biography

Aides to the President of Russia
Russian jurists
Soviet jurists
20th-century jurists
Moscow State University alumni
Politicians from Moscow
Russian women
1957 births
Living people
1st class Active State Councillors of the Russian Federation